Robin Moore Hardy (born 1955) is the author of more than twenty published books and several unpublished manuscripts. She currently resides in North Texas. Her first novel, Chataine's Guardian, was the runner-up for the Gold Medallion Book Award in 1985.

Biography
Robin Moore was born in Fort Worth, Texas in January 1955. When she was seventeen, a severe sinus infection rendered her profoundly deaf in both ears. After high school, she moved to Waco to attend college at Baylor University, where she graduated Phi Beta Kappa in 1977. Shortly thereafter she was employed as an editor with Word Publishing. Moore married in 1976, but did not have children until after her mother died from colon cancer in 1978. After the birth of her first child in 1981 Moore became a homemaker, and this gave her the impetus to become a story-teller.

There are at least two other authors that have written under the name Robin Hardy. The books not written by this Robin Hardy include The Wicker Man, Cowboys for Christ, The Education of Don Juan, The Call of the Wendigo and The Crisis of Desire.

In her early twenties, Robin Hardy discovered literature professor and Christian apologetic C. S. Lewis. She was profoundly affected by his commitment to the story and accessible style, and she determined to apply those principles in her works. Other influences include Saki, Samuel Rutherford, Hannah Whitall Smith and J. B. Phillips.

As apparent from her turbulent publishing history, Hardy has been an author ahead of her time. She writes from a Christian perspective, but her books are often too controversial for Christian audiences due to their realistic and uncomfortably penetrating nature. In spite of this, however, she has acquired a following over the last twenty years, and has set a precedent followed by more well-known authors like Francine Rivers.

Hardy was carried by both Word Publishers and NavPress. She is currently the primary author for Westford Press.

Bibliography
Hardy's published books include:

 The Annals of Lystra: Chataine's Guardian (Word, 1984)
 Reprinted by NavPress, 1994
 Currently in print by Westford Press, 2004
 The Annals of Lystra: Stone of Help (Word, 1985)
 Reprinted by NavPress, 1994
 Currently in print by Westford Press, 2005
 The Annals of Lystra: High Lord of Lystra (Word, 1985)
 Reprinted by NavPress, 1994. The title was changed to Liberation of Lystra.
 Currently in print by Westford Press, 2006
 Streiker's Bride (NavPress, 1993)
 Reprinted by Westford Press, 2004
 Streiker the Killdeer (NavPress, 1994)
 Reprinted by Westford Press, 2004
 Padre (NavPress, 1994)
 Reprinted by Westford Press, 2007
 Streiker's Morning Sun (NavPress, 1995)
 Reprinted by Westford Press, 2004
 Sammy: Dallas Detective (Vital Issues Press, 1997)
 Reprinted by Westford Press, 2004
 Sifted but Saved by W.W. Melton (Broadman & Holman, 2001)
 Sammy: Women Troubles (Westford Press, 2004)
 Sammy: Working for a Living (Westford Press, 2004)
 The Latter Annals of Lystra: Nicole of Prie Mer (Westford Press, 2004)
 The Latter Annals of Lystra: Ares of Westford (Westford Press, 2004)
 Sammy: On Vacation (Westford Press, 2005)
 The Latter Annals of Lystra: Prisoners of Hope (Westford Press, 2005)
 Sammy: Little Misunderstandings (Westford Press, 2006)
 The Latter Annals of Lystra: Road of Vanishing (Westford Press, 2006)
 His Strange Ways: The Sequel to Padre (Westford Press, 2007)
 Sammy: Ghosts (Westford Press, 2007)
 The Latter Annals of Lystra: Dead Man's Token (Westford Press, 2007)
 The Idecis (Westford Press, 2008)

External links
 robinhardy.com
 Robin Hardy at Amazon
 "In the Library" review, Page 1
 "In the Library" review, Page 2
 A Romance Review
 Romance Reader's Connection: Ares of Westford review
 Romance Reader's Connection: Nicole of Prie Mer review

1955 births
Living people
20th-century American novelists
21st-century American novelists
American women novelists
People from Fort Worth, Texas
Baylor University alumni
20th-century American women writers
21st-century American women writers